Events from the year 1622 in Portuguese Macau.

Incumbents
 Captains-Major - Lopo Sarmento de Carvalho

Events

June
 22–24 June - Battle of Macau.

References

1622 in China
1622 in the Portuguese Empire
Macau
Macau
Years of the 17th century in Macau